This article is the list of Armenian American politicians, officeholders and party chairpersons.

Bold indicates incumbent officeholders.

Note: persons are classified by chronological order

Federal government

Cabinet officials

Executive Office of the President
Ken Khachigian, White House Director of Speechwriting, Reagan Administration
Aram Bakshian, White House Director of Speechwriting, Reagan Administration
Ike Hajinazarian, White House Regional Communications Director, Biden Administration
Jeff Marootian, Special Assistant to the President for Climate and Science Agency Personnel, Biden Administration

Members of Congress

Federal Judicial

State government

Governors

Other state officials

State Judicial

Legislature

Lower

Upper

Municipal government

Mayors

Mayors of Glendale, California

Other
Paul Krekorian, Los Angeles City Council (2010—)
Nina Hachigian, Deputy Mayor of International Affairs for Los Angeles (2017–2022)

Ambassadors

Other political figures
Barry Zorthian, diplomat and press spokesman during the Vietnam War
Edward N. Costikyan, New York-based political personality
Danny Tarkanian, Nevada-based politician and candidate
Jeff Kurzon, New York City attorney and politician
Terry Phillips, non-partisan candidate for California's 23rd congressional district in 2012
Scott Ashjian
David Krikorian
Paul Paul
Simon Marootian
Ralph Moradian
Haiganush R. Bedrosian
Robert Hagopian, Saugus, Massachusetts Town 1974

See also
List of Armenian Americans
List of Jewish American politicians

References

 
American
Armenian